Hugh Jacob Torney (14 November 1909 – 10 February 2000) was an Australian rules footballer who played with Essendon in the Victorian Football League (VFL), and with Williamstown in the Victorian Football Association (VFA).

Family
The son of John Torney and Catherine Torney, née Brown,  Torney was born on 14 November 1909.

He married Joyce Eudora Davis (1916-2005) in 1941; they had three daughters, Pamela, Lorraine, and Beverley.

Football

South Melbourne (VFL)
Along with two of his Patchewollock team-mates, H. "Bub" Jamieson, and Reg Bryans, Torney tried out with South Melbourne in the 1933 pre-season. None of the three made South Melbourne's final list.

Essendon (VFL)
A ruckman, Torney kicked with his left foot and formed a lethal combination during his career with rover Dick Reynolds.

He had his finest season in 1940, winning the Essendon Best and Fairest award and finishing second in the Brownlow Medal count. His 24 Brownlow votes were at the time the most ever by a player not to win the medal. Torney was a premiership player in 1942 and also represented Victoria in 1937, 1939, and 1941.

He retired at the end of the 1943 season.

Willamstown (VFA)
He came out of retirement in 1945, and played one season with the VFA team Williamstown. He played 18 games and kicked 2 goals.

Footnotes

References
 Maplestone, M., Flying Higher: History of the Essendon Football Club 1872–1996, Essendon Football Club, (Melbourne), 1996. 
 Ross, J. (ed), 100 Years of Australian Football 1897–1996: The Complete Story of the AFL, All the Big Stories, All the Great Pictures, All the Champions, Every AFL Season Reported, Viking, (Ringwood), 1996.

External links
 
 
 Profile at Essendonfc.com
 Brief biography
 Hugh Torney, Boyles Football Photos.

1909 births
2000 deaths
Australian rules footballers from Victoria (Australia)
Essendon Football Club players
Essendon Football Club Premiership players
Williamstown Football Club players
Crichton Medal winners
One-time VFL/AFL Premiership players